Tsuen Wan Chinese Permanent Cemetery is a cemetery in Kwai Chung, Hong Kong located adjacent to the Kwai Chung Public Mortuary. It is managed by The Board of Management of the Chinese Permanent Cemeteries. It is the second Chinese permanent cemetery in Hong Kong after Aberdeen Chinese Permanent Cemetery and it lies on the slopes between Riviera Gardens and Tsuen Wan Abattoir, facing Gin Drinkers Bay and Rambler Channel. The term 'Permanent' refers to the cemetery site, not the graves.

In terms of administrative divisions, Tsuen Wan District and Kwai Tsing District are bounded by Texaco Road and Tsing Tsuen Bridge. The cemetery is located to the south of the boundary line, so it belongs to Kwai Tsing District.

History
On 9 August 1935, the Hong Kong Government had approved the land in Tsuen Wan with an area of about 120,000 m2. It was opened on 19 June 1941 and is one of the four Chinese Permanent Cemeteries in Hong Kong.

In order to provide more niches to meet demand, the two columbariums in the cemetery were completed in 1974 and 1987 respectively and the expansion of the first columbarium was completed in 2015, in order to cope with the popularity of cremation niches to bring in high demand.

Notable burials
 Eu Tong Sen (1877–1941), leading businessman in Malaya, Singapore and Hong Kong
 Chan Chak (1894–1949), admiral of the Republic of China Navy
 Tam Woon-tong (1872–1954), former Prime Minister of Po Leung Kuk, founder of Kowloon Motor Bus
 Li Zuyong (1903–1959), Hong Kong film producer and entrepreneur
 Tang Ti-sheng (1917–1959), Cantonese opera playwright, scriptwriter, and film director
 Henry Leong (1890–1961), comprador of Jardine Matheson in the 20th century
 Au-Yeung Kim (1914–1961), Hong Kong film actor
 Chan Nam Cheong (1900–1971), founder of Vitasoy, The Hong Kong Sze Yap Commercial and Industrial Association and San Wui Commercial Society
 Alan Li Fook-sum (1937–2003), former chairman of Kowloon Dairy and Hong Kong Jockey Club

See also
 List of cemeteries in Hong Kong

References

External links

 

Cemeteries in Hong Kong
Kwai Chung